The Leslie Salt Company was a salt-producing company located in the San Francisco Bay Area, at the current locations of Newark, Hayward and other parts of the bay.

Background

They produced salt using salt evaporation ponds on the shores of the San Francisco Bay. By the 1940s, Leslie Salt under the dominant ownership of the Schilling family  had become the largest private land owner in the Bay Area. They were purchased by Cargill in 1978.

See also

Oliver Salt Company
Eden Landing Ecological Reserve
Laguna Creek Watershed
Don Edwards San Francisco Bay National Wildlife Refuge
A box of Leslie Free Running Salt, with the brand name obscured, can be seen in The Three Stooges short "An Ache in Every Stake" (1941).

References

External links

Defunct companies based in the San Francisco Bay Area
Saltworks
History of the San Francisco Bay Area
Food and drink in the San Francisco Bay Area
History of Hayward, California
Food and drink companies based in California